Mongour, formerly also known by various names including Tu and Dchiahour, may refer to:

 Monguor people
 Monguor language